Víctor Peralta Jiménez (born September 16, 1942) is a retired long-distance runner from Mexico, who won the bronze medal in the men's half marathon at the 1962 Central American and Caribbean Games in Kingston, Jamaica. He competed at the 1964 Summer Olympics in Tokyo, Japan, finishing in 53rd place in the men's marathon.

References
sports-reference

1942 births
Living people
Mexican male long-distance runners
Athletes (track and field) at the 1964 Summer Olympics
Olympic athletes of Mexico
Central American and Caribbean Games bronze medalists for Mexico
Competitors at the 1962 Central American and Caribbean Games
Central American and Caribbean Games medalists in athletics
20th-century Mexican people